The Andorran Basketball Federation is the governing body of basketball in Andorra. It was founded in 1988. It organizes the internal league and runs the Andorra national basketball team and also the men's and women's national 3x3 teams.

The current president of the federation is Manuel Fernández.

Achievements
 EuroBasket Division C - 1998, 2000, 2004, 2012, 2014

See also
 Andorra national basketball team

External links
 Andorra Basketball Federation
 Profile at FIBA.basketball

An
Basketball in Andorra
Sports organizations established in 1988
1988 establishments in Andorra
Basketball